Shurak may refer to:
 Shurak-e Vosta, a village in Kuhbanan County, Kerman Province, Iran
 Shurak, Mazandaran, a village in Babolsar County, Mazandaran Province, Iran
 Shurak, North Khorasan, a village in Maneh and Samalqan County, North Khorasan Province, Iran
 Shurak-e Bala, a village in Jajrom County, North Khorasan Province, Iran
 Shurak, Razavi Khorasan, a village in Chenaran County, Razavi Khorasan Province, Iran
 Shurak-e Maleki, a village in Mashhad County, Razavi Khorasan Province, Iran
 Shurak, Khash, a village in Khash County, Sistan and Baluchestan Province, Iran
 Shurak, Nehbandan, a village in Nehbandan County, South Khorasan Province, Iran
 Shurak, Shusef, a village in Nehbandan County, South Khorasan Province, Iran

See also
 Shurek (disambiguation)